The United States Revenue Act of 1926, reduced inheritance and personal income taxes, cancelled many excise imposts, eliminated the gift tax and ended public access to federal income tax returns.

Passed by the 69th Congress, it was signed into law by President Calvin Coolidge.

The act was applicable to incomes for 1925 and thereafter.

Tax on Corporations 
A rate of 13.5 percent was levied on the net income of corporations.

Tax on individuals 
A normal tax and a surtax were levied against the net income of individuals as shown in the following table.

Exemption of $1,500 for single filers and $3,500 for married couples and heads of family. A $400 exemption for each dependent under 18.

References 

United States federal taxation legislation
1926 in American law
Presidency of Calvin Coolidge